The Arahura Deed was a land sale and agreement between Kāi Tahu iwi and James Mackay on behalf of the New Zealand settler government, signed on 21 May 1860 by Poutini chiefs at Māwhera (modern-day Greymouth).

It also allowed Kāi Tahu to buy back land between the river and Tūhua mountain at 10s. per acre (12,000 times as expensive as the acres sold to the government). In 1991 the Waitangi Tribunal found that, "In offering to pay no more than a nominal price for land which had the potential for a very early substantial rise in value, the tribunal concluded that the Crown failed to act with the degree of good faith required of one Treaty partner to the other."

References

History of the West Coast, New Zealand
1860 in New Zealand
Ngāi Tahu